Peer-to-peer computing or networking is a distributed application architecture that partitions tasks or workloads between peers.

Peer-to-peer may also refer to:

Economics
 Peer-to-peer banking
 Peer-to-peer carsharing
 Peer-to-peer lending
 Peer-to-peer economy, another name for the sharing economy

Other uses
 Peer-to-peer file sharing
 Social peer-to-peer processes
 P2P economic system

See also

 P2P (disambiguation)
 Anonymous P2P systems in which participants remain anonymous
 Peer production
 Private peer-to-peer